El cantar de mis penas is a 1941 Argentine film.

Credited cast
 Héctor Palacios
 Laura Nelson
 Lea Conti
 Enrique Vimo
 Ramón Vila

External links
 

1941 films
1940s Spanish-language films
Argentine black-and-white films
1940s musical drama films
Argentine musical drama films
1941 drama films
1940s Argentine films